A pork pie hat is one of several different styles of hat that have been popular since the mid-19th century. It features a flat crown that resembles a traditional pork pie.

Buster Keaton and the 1920s

The pork pie began to appear in Britain as a man's hat not long after the turn of the century in the fashion style of the man-about-town. Silent film actor Buster Keaton converted fedoras into straw boater-like felt pork pies by stiffening their brims with a dried sugar-water solution. This kind of pork pie had a very flat top and similar short flat brim.

1930s and 1940s
The heyday of the pork pie hat occurred during the Great Depression, following the straw boater era that peaked in the Roaring Twenties. In this incarnation, the pork pie regained its snap brim and increased slightly in height.  Its dished crown became known among milliners as "telescopic crowns" or "tight telescopes" because when worn the top could be made to pop up slightly. Furthermore, as stated in a newspaper clipping from the mid-1930s: "The true pork pie hat is so made that it cannot be worn successfully except when telescoped." The same clipping refers to the hat also as "the bi crowned". Among famous wearers of the pork pie during this era are Frank Lloyd Wright, whose pork pie hat had a very wide brim and rather tall crown. Lester Young, whose career as a jazz saxophonist spanned from the mid-1920s to the late 1950s, regularly wore a pork pie hat during his performances, and after his death Charles Mingus composed a musical elegy in Young's honor entitled "Goodbye Pork Pie Hat".  Young's pork pie had a broader brim than seen in earlier styles but retained the definitive round, flat, creased crown.
A porkpie hat was a trademark of physicist Robert Oppenheimer, scientific director of the World WarII project that developed the atomic bomb.

In African American culture in the 1940s the pork pie—flashy, feathered, color-coordinated—became associated with the zoot suit.  By 1944 the hat was even prevalent in New Guinea.

Post-1950s

After the end of World War II the pork pie's broad popularity declined somewhat, though as a result of the zoot suit connection it continued its association with African American music culture, particularly jazz, blues, and ska. In television between 1951 and 1955, Art Carney frequently wore one in his characterization of Ed Norton in The Honeymooners, and in Puerto Rico the actor Joaquín Monserrat, known as Pacheco, was the host of many children's 1950s TV shows and was known for his straw pork pie hat and bow tie—in this incarnation, the pork pie returned to its Buster Keaton style with rigidly flat brim and extremely low flat crown.

In the 1960s in Jamaica, the "rude boy" subculture popularized a hat known as a pork-pie, and brought it back into style in the United Kingdom, thereby influencing its occasional appearance in the mod and rave subculture. However the rude boy hat is really a tall trilby, and doesn't resemble other pork pie hats. 

The porkpie hat enjoyed a slight resurgence in exposure and popularity after Gene Hackman's character Jimmy "Popeye" Doyle wore one in the 1971 film The French Connection. Doyle was based on real-life policeman Eddie Egan, who played the captain in the film, and his exploits. Egan was famous all his life for wearing a pork pie hat. At about the same time, Robert De Niro wore a pork pie hat in the 1973 film Mean Streets (the same hat he wore when he auditioned for the film).

Contemporary associations
A frequent wearer of pork pie hats is Panamanian Salsa singer and composer Ruben Blades. Today the wearing of a pork pie hat retains some of its 1930s and 40s associations. Fashion writer Glenn O'Brien says,

Bryan Cranston's character Walter White wears a pork pie hat in the AMC series Breaking Bad when he appears as his alter ego "Heisenberg", whose persona is associated with the hat.  Sony Pictures Television donated "Heisenberg's" hat to the Smithsonian Institution.

xkcd character "Black Hat" is known for wearing a black pork pie hat - a distinguishing visual as xkcd creator Randall Munroe portrays his characters in typical "stick figure" style.

References

External links

 Pork Pie Hat vs. Fedora – Article on key differences in hat styles

1860s fashion
1870s fashion
1880s fashion
1890s fashion
1900s fashion
1910s fashion
1920s fashion
1930s fashion
1940s fashion
1950s fashion
1960s fashion
1970s fashion
1980s fashion
1990s fashion
2000s fashion
2010s fashion
2020s fashion
Hats